Starcz  is a village in the administrative district of Gmina Lutocin, within Żuromin County, Masovian Voivodeship, in east-central Poland.

The village has a population of 10.

References

Starcz